Toshimichi is a masculine Japanese given name.

Possible writings
Toshimichi can be written using different combinations of kanji characters. Some examples:

敏道, "agile, way"
敏路, "agile, route"
敏通, "agile, pass through"
俊道, "talented, way"
俊路, "talented, route"
俊通, "talented, pass through"
利道, "benefit, way"
利路, "benefit, route"
利通, "benefit, pass through"
年道, "year, way"
年路, "year, route"
寿道, "long life, way"
寿路, "long life, route"

The name can also be written in hiragana としみち or katakana トシミチ.

Notable people with the name
Toshimichi Okubo (大久保 利通, 1830–1878), Japanese samurai.
Toshimichi Takatsukasa (鷹司 平通, 1923–1966), Japanese noble.

Japanese masculine given names